Everything to Gain: Making the Most of the Rest of Your Life is a 1987 memoir co-written by Jimmy Carter, the 39th president of the United States, and his wife, Rosalynn Carter. The Washington Post described it as "a curious production, half memoir and half self-help book", and concluded that much of the advice was not unique to the book, saying it raised the question "Was this book really necessary?"

References

1987 non-fiction books
Books by Jimmy Carter
Random House books
Rosalynn Carter
Books written by presidents of the United States